The multidelay block frequency domain adaptive filter (MDF) algorithm is a block-based frequency domain implementation of the (normalised) Least mean squares filter (LMS) algorithm.

Introduction 
The MDF algorithm is based on the fact that convolutions may be efficiently computed in the frequency domain (thanks to the fast Fourier transform). However, the algorithm differs from the fast LMS algorithm in that block size it uses may be smaller than the filter length. If both are equal, then MDF reduces to the FLMS algorithm.

The advantages of MDF over the (N)LMS algorithm are:
 Lower algorithmic complexity
 Partial de-correlation of the input (which 'may' lead to faster convergence)

Variable definitions 

Let  be the length of the processing blocks,  be the number of blocks and  denote the 2Nx2N Fourier transform matrix. The variables are defined as:

 
 
 
 
With normalisation matrices  and :

 
 
 

This is meant to remove the effects of the circular convolution.

Algorithm description 
For each block, the MDF algorithm is computed as: 
 
 
 
 

It is worth noting that, while the algorithm is more easily expressed in matrix form, the actual implementation requires no matrix multiplications. For instance the normalisation matrix computation  reduces to an element-wise vector multiplication because  is block-diagonal. The same goes for other multiplications.

References 
 J.-S. Soo and K. Pang, “Multidelay block frequency domain adaptive filter,” IEEE Transactions on Acoustics, Speech, and Signal Processing, vol. 38, no. 2, pp. 373–376, 1990.
 H. Buchner, J. Benesty, W. Kellermann, "An Extended Multidelay Filter: Fast Low-Delay Algorithms for Very High-Order Adaptive Systems". Proc. IEEE International Conference on Acoustics, Speech, and Signal Processing (ICASSP), 2003.
 A free implementation of the MDF algorithm is available in Speex (main source file)

See also 
 Adaptive filter
 Recursive least squares
 For statistical techniques relevant to LMS filter see Least squares.

Digital signal processing
Filter theory